The 1981 Wisconsin Badgers football team represented the University of Wisconsin–Madison in the 1981 Big Ten Conference football season.

Several Wisconsin players ranked among the Big Ten leaders, including the following:
 Quarterback Jess Cole ranked seventh in the conference with 12 passing touchdowns and ninth with 1,180 passing yards. 
 Running back John Williams ranked second in the conference with 5.5 rushing yards per carry and seventh with 634 rushing yards.
 David Greenwood led the conference with 156 interception return yards, and he and Matt Vanden Boom tied for second in the conference with six interceptions each.

Wisconsin made its first bowl appearance since the 1963 Rose Bowl.

Schedule

Personnel

Game summaries

Michigan

Source: Gainesville Sun
    
    
    
    
    

Wisconsin safety Matt Vanden Boom had three interceptions, including the game-clincher with two seconds left at his own 17. It was the Badgers first win against Michigan since 1962 and the first time they scored points against the Wolverines since 1976.

at Minnesota

Head coach Dave McClain inserted backup Randy Wright in the fourth quarter after Minnesota took the lead for the first time, on the reason "because Cole was not having a good day throwing." Following the victory, Wisconsin accepted the bid from the Garden State Bowl to play Tennessee.

1982 NFL Draft

References

Wisconsin
Wisconsin Badgers football seasons
Wisconsin Badgers football